The women's 1500 metres event at the 1985 IAAF World Indoor Games was held at the Palais Omnisports Paris-Bercy on 19 January.

Results

References

1500
1500 metres at the World Athletics Indoor Championships